Keith Teare (born 27 August 1954, in Scarborough, North Riding of Yorkshire) is an English-American technology entrepreneur.

Career
Keith Teare has founded or co-founded several IT companies since the early 1980s.

He is credited with being part of:
Cyberia, the UK's first internet cafe;
Easynet, Europe's first consumer Internet Service Provider;
RealNames, the first multi-lingual addressing system for the Internet;
Archimedes Ventures LLC, a vehicle for his incubation, investments and consulting service;
TechCrunch, a technology blog.
Just.me, an instant messaging service;
chat.center, a web to mobile SaaS messaging service;
Accelerated Digital Ventures.

Works

References

External links

 Keith Teare's weblog
 OpenQuotes from Keith Teare
 Accelerated Digital Ventures Ltd
 https://www.bloomberg.com/profile/person/1933457

1954 births
Living people
People from Scarborough, North Yorkshire